Emilia Augusta Clementina Broomé, née Lothigius (13 January 1866 – 2 June 1925), was a Swedish politician (liberal), feminist and peace activist. She was the first woman in the Swedish legislative assembly (1914).

Life 
Emilia Broomé was born on 13 October 1866 in Jönköping. raised in Jönköping, where she studied at the local girls school. She was given her professional degree at Wallinska skolan in 1883 and graduated in philosophy and medicine in Uppsala in 1884. She was thereafter employed as a teacher at the school of Anna Whitlock in Stockholm.

She was the chairman of Stockholmsföreningen för kvinnans politiska rösträtt (The Stockholm Branch of the National Association for Women's Suffrage) from its foundation in 1902 until 1906.

She was also chairman of the Peace union of the women of Sweden, from the year she founded it in 1898 until it merged with the Swedish peace union in 1911, and acted as Sweden's representative at the international peace conference in Haag in 1899.

Emilia Broomé was nominated for the election to the Stockholm City Council in 1910 and in 1911. She was elected to the city council during the latter election and served 1911–1924. She was chairman of the liberal women 1917–1920.

Emilia Broomé was the first Swedish woman to have been a part of the Swedish state legislative committee (Lagberedningen), which prepared for new laws and in which she served as a member in 1914–1918. She took part in writing the reformed marriage law in 1920, in which men and women were made equal and the married woman was declared of legal majority; in the law of equal salary for men and women in 1921; and the law (Behörighetslagen) which granted women the right to all official professions in 1923.

See also 
 Hanna Lindberg
 List of peace activists

References

Sources 
 Ub.gu.se
 Ub.gu.se
 Historisktidskrift.se
 Barbro Hedvall (2011). Susanna Eriksson Lundqvist. red. Vår rättmätiga plats. Om kvinnornas kamp för rösträtt.. Förlag Bonnier.

Further reading 
 

1866 births
1925 deaths
Swedish suffragists
Women members of the Riksdag
Members of the Riksdag
Swedish pacifists
Pacifist feminists